agnès b. (born Agnès Andrée Marguerite Troublé, 1941) is a French fashion designer known for her self-named brand, which includes fashion and film interests.

Life and early career
Agnès had mixed twins at 19 and she separated from their father :fr:Christian Bourgois at 20. She graduated from École du Louvre in Paris. A career soon followed when her personal style caught the eyes of Elle magazine staffers at a Paris flea market. Her style of dress at the time, which included selections from France's Monoprix discount chain, was inspired less by fashion than thrift, but the magazine liked what it saw and hired her as a junior editor. With a mind towards designing rather than editing fashion, she left ELLE after less than two years, preferring apprenticeships even when they paid little and offered no time off. She became a designer, buyer, and press attaché for Dorothée Bis in Paris. She freelance designed for Limitex, Pierre d'Alby, V de V, and Eversbin in the years 1965 and '66. In the latter year, she founded CMC (Comptoir Mondial de Création), parent of the agnès b. label. She opened her first boutique in Les Halles in 1975. Formerly a butcher shop, the black and white tiled store had a rustic, communal atmosphere, defined by an indoor swing for children and an impromptu aviary (in reality an on-site bird population that over time grew from two to 30). Birds flew free in the cavernous space, built nests and hatched their chicks in the displays. "It was very cool" she says "We were writing on the walls." agnès's friends were her first repeat customers.

Expansion

agnès b. started designing menswear in 1981 after observing men appropriate clothes designed for women. She opened her first international store on Prince Street in New York's SoHo district in 1983. Her enthusiasm for the city stemmed from her love of the American crime film genre, dubbed film noir in France. This interest extended to the store's decor, which included vintage, oversized movie posters. The one-sheets would eventually draw the attention of filmmaker Harmony Korine, who would begin an artistic collaboration with agnès in 1999.

agnès b. launched "Le b." perfume in 1987, a skincare and cosmetics line. Over time, her designs would grow to include maternity wear, shoes, and bags. Additionally, agnès b. has designed watches and eyewear for Seiko and a beauty line for L'Oréal. She has shops in London, Amsterdam, Singapore, Taipei, Tokyo, Hong Kong, and New York with more to open in Beijing and Shanghai.

agnès b. now operates three stores in the US, all located in New York City.

Agnès Troublé says she wants to set an example with her business and social responsibility: 'To me, there is a consistency between the fact that the clothes are made here and what I am, what I do, what I love to do.' She currently supports several associations, including AIDES, ACT UP and Handicap International.

Gallery and periodical
In 1984, agnès b. opened the Galerie du Jour in Paris, exhibiting Graffiti artists such as A-one, Futura 2000, Henry "Banger" Benvenuti, Sharp, and others;  Bazooka, Bad BC, Echo et Mode2, BBC (Bad Boys Crew), Ash, Skki et Jayonedont, Les Tétines Noires, les Frères Ripoulin. The library-gallery on rue du Jour eventually relocated to rue Quincampoix in the 4th arrondissement. A second library-gallery agnès b. then opened in Japan.

The brand also has a periodical on contemporary art called Point d'ironie.

Film interests and production company
agnès b. founded a joint film concern with Harmony Korine called O'Salvation, under whose banner Korine began production on Mister Lonely in London in 2006.

She also designated an entity for personal projects, christened Love Streams, with the blessing of Gena Rowlands, widow of John Cassavetes, who directed the 1984 film of the same name.

Her acts of film patronage include the supplying of completion funds to Gaspar Noé for Irréversible (2002) and to Claire Denis for Trouble Every Day (2001), as well as the underwriting of numerous film festivals. She has also directed two documentaries (as Agnès Troublé): Une sorte de journal vidéo in 2011, and Je m'appelle Hmmm.... in 2013, which entered in competition for the Orizzonti section of the 70th Venice International Film Festival.

The brand also has a film production company, Love streams productions agnès b.

Honours 
 She was made Chevalier (Knight) of the Ordre national du Mérite on 21 May 1985, and promoted Officier (Officer) in 1997.

 She was made Chevalier (Knight) of the Légion d'honneur in 2000.

Notes
"Mother of Reinvention" by David Hershkovits, Paper Magazine, retrieved April 17, 2006
"Agnès B: Film & Fashion" by Boyd Davis, Fashion Windows website, retrieved April 18, 2006
agnes b., 2000 interview by Mary Clarke, Index Magazine, retrieved April 17, 2006
 Liberté, Égalité, Agnès B. by Laura Jacobs, Vanity Fair September 2011

References

External links
 

1941 births
Living people
French fashion designers
French film producers
French women film producers
French environmentalists
French women environmentalists
Chevaliers of the Légion d'honneur
Officers of the Ordre national du Mérite
High fashion brands
People from Versailles
French women fashion designers